Administrative divisions of Korea may refer to:
Provinces of Korea, of the Korean Empire and of Korea under Japanese rule
Eight Provinces of Korea (later thirteen), under the Joseon Dynasty
Administrative divisions of North Korea
Administrative divisions of South Korea

See also 
 Regions of Korea